Miguel Ángel Guerra (born 31 August 1953 in Buenos Aires) is a former racing driver from Argentina. He participated in four Formula One Grands Prix, debuting on 15 March 1981. He qualified for only one of these, the 1981 San Marino Grand Prix, in which his Osella was hit by the March of Eliseo Salazar on the first lap. Guerra's car hit a wall, and he suffered a broken wrist and ankle.

Following his Formula One career, Guerra competed in multiple Argentine and South American championships. In 1984 he was vice-champion of Formula Two Codasur and in 1989 he win the TC 2000 championship. He also raced in South American Formula Three, Turismo Nacional, Turismo Carretera, Top Race and South American Super Touring Car Championship.

Racing record

Complete European Formula Two Championship results 
(key) (Races in bold indicate pole position; races in italics indicate fastest lap)

Complete Formula One results
(key)

References

Profile at grandprix.com

1953 births
Living people
Racing drivers from Buenos Aires
Argentine racing drivers
Argentine Formula One drivers
European Formula Two Championship drivers
Osella Formula One drivers
Turismo Carretera drivers
TC 2000 Championship drivers
Top Race V6 drivers